Criterium DecisionPlus is decision-making software that is based on multi-criteria decision making.

The software implements the Analytic Hierarchy Process (AHP)
and the Simple Multi-Attribute Rating Technique (SMART)
and has been used in fields such as materials science 
and environmental management.

Criterium DecisionPlus is supplied by InfoHarvest Inc.

References

Decision-making software